Indirect presidential elections were held in Brazil on 15 January 1974. They were the fourth presidential elections held under the military government and were carried out through an electoral college.

Background
All elections during the military government elected candidates from the National Renewal Alliance Party (ARENA), though the 1966 and 1969 were one-party elections. In other elections during the military government, there were two parties running for elections.

Candidates
The candidatures were defined in September 1973, on party conventions. The first defined were from the ARENA on day 14 and 15, when Ernesto Geisel was chosen as president candidate, and Adalberto Pereira dos Santos as vice-president.

The Brazilian Democratic Movement (MDB) chose its candidates on day 22, when they chose Ulysses Guimarães and Barbosa Lima Sobrinho with 201 votes. The MDB president declared that "with no popular vote, all solutions chosen will be from the ruling party".

Results

References

Presidential elections in Brazil
Brazil
President
January 1974 events in South America